, based in Matsuyama and Tokyo, Japan, is the third largest Japanese agricultural machinery manufacturing company. Its products include tractors, combine harvesters, rice transplanters, riding mowers, zero-turn mowers, tillers, components, and diesel engines.

It was incorporated in 1936 as Iseki & Co.

Iseki began building tractors in 1961. Early models of the Iseki tractor were built under Porsche-Diesel's technology and design transfer contract. Its tractors have been and are sold worldwide under various brands: AGCO, Bolens, Challenger, Massey Ferguson and White. Some models sold in Japan have been built by Landini of Italy and by Massey Ferguson in France.

Early TYM tractors were based on Iseki's designs and used Iseki's expertise.

Iseki also has joint ventures with other companies, among them Dongfeng Motor.

Iseki have changed the way grass clippings are collected on their garden tractors. Unlike most machines where the grass is forced up over the transmission and other elements, the Iseki tractor has a system where the transmission is passed to the wheels by a series of chains, much like a rice paddy tractor.

External links

Iseki global website

References

Agricultural machinery manufacturers of Japan
Tractor manufacturers of Japan
Engine manufacturers of Japan
Diesel engine manufacturers
Japanese brands
Manufacturing companies based in Tokyo
Companies based in Ehime Prefecture
Manufacturing companies established in 1926
Japanese companies established in 1926
Companies listed on the Tokyo Stock Exchange